Portland Point is the southernmost point in Jamaica. It is halfway along the island's south coast at the end of a hilly peninsula in Clarendon. A large bay, Portland Bight, lies to the east of it.

See also
List of countries by southernmost point

References

Headlands of Jamaica
Extreme points of Jamaica
Geography of Clarendon Parish, Jamaica